This is a list of Billboard magazine's Top Hot 100 songs of 1972. The Top 100, as revealed in the year-end edition of Billboard dated December 30, 1972, is based on Hot 100 charts from the issue dates of December 4, 1971 through November 18, 1972.

See also
1972 in music
List of Billboard Hot 100 number-one singles of 1972
List of Billboard Hot 100 top-ten singles in 1972

References

1972 record charts
Billboard charts